Aohan Banner (Mongolian:   Aoqan qosiɣu) is a banner of southeastern Inner Mongolia, People's Republic of China, bordering Liaoning province to the south. It is under the administration of Chifeng City,  to the west.

Climate

References

www.xzqh.org 

Banners of Inner Mongolia
Chifeng